TNFAIP3 interacting protein 3 is a protein that in humans is encoded by the TNIP3 gene.

References

Further reading